Convolvulus remotus is a herb in the family Convolvulaceae.

The perennial herb has twisted or twining and climbing habit. It blooms between September and December producing pink flowers.

It is found on floodplains and in gullies in the Wheatbelt, Mid West and Goldfields-Esperance regions of Western Australia where it grows in sandy-clay soils over sandstone or limestone.

References

remotus
Plants described in 1810
Taxa named by Robert Brown (botanist, born 1773)